Walter is a British television drama directed by Stephen Frears and starring Ian McKellen, Barbara Jefford, Tony Melody, David Ryall, Keith Allen, Paula Tilbrook, and Jim Broadbent. It was first broadcast on the launch night of Channel 4 on 2 November 1982. Based on a 1978 novel of the same name by David Cook, it was the first ever Film on Four.

Plot
The film was directed by Stephen Frears and stars Ian McKellen as Walter, a man with a learning difficulties. The story focuses initially on his youth in which his parents attempt, with little success, to have him adapt into the conditions of a "normal" life. Walter's father dies, followed soon after by his mother. The social services bureaucracy then place him in a psychiatric institution. Walter is molested by another patient, witnesses the murder of a patient by another patient having a breakdown and remains in the institution for the rest of the film.

Cast
 Ian McKellen as Walter
 Barbara Jefford as Sarah, Walter's mother
 Arthur Whybrow as Walter's father
 Tony Melody as Mr Hingley
 David Ryall as Mr Richards
 Linda Polan as Miss Rushden
 Keith Allen as Mike (Stockroom)
 Lesley Claire O'Neill as Jean (Stockroom)
 Paula Tilbrook as Mrs. Ashby
 Marjorie Yeats as Social Worker
 Jim Broadbent as Joseph (Orderly)
 Kenny Ireland as Angus (Orderly)
 Donald McKillop as Mr Lipman
 Nabil Shaban as Ben Gunn
 Bob Flag as Harold
 Lol Coxhill as Hospital Patient
 Robert Walker as Staff Nurse
 John Surman as Male Nurse
 Trevor Laird as Errol (Nurse)
 Robin Hooper as Orderly (Washroom)
 Stephen Petcher as Dave (Stockroom)
 Garry Cooper as Roger (Stockroom)
 Frankie Connolly as Young Walter

Reception

Critical response
The Evening Standard reported at the time:Channel 4 is taking the extraordinary step of launching itself with one of the most shocking films about mental illness ever shown on British TV. Walter, which occupies the key slot in next Tuesday's opening night schedule, features scenes of homosexual molestation in a mental hospital, patients covered in excrement, and a suicide in a barber's shop.

As part of his review of Channel 4's launch night, Chris Dunkley of the Financial Times wrote that: The temptation is to go overboard in praise of Walter, first of the channel's 'Film On Four' productions, because its cause was so worthy and the central performance by Ian McKellen so overpoweringly moving.

Accolades
The film was nominated for two BAFTA TV awards for Best Make Up and Best Single Drama in 1983. McKellen won The Royal Television Society Performer of the Year for his performance.

Sequels
A sequel, directed by Frears and starring McKellen, entitled Walter and June and set some 19 years later, was aired in May 1983.  Walter and June was adapted from David Cook's novel Winter Doves. Walter falls in love with an attractive fellow-patient (played by Sarah Miles) and at her urging the two escape and attempt a life together in the outside world. At first matters go well, but ultimately Walter comes to the sad realisation that he cannot relate to others not like him and he returns alone to the sheltered refuge of the asylum.

The two films are sometimes packaged together in an edited form under the title "Loving Walter" (when played together the original two films run to 2 hours 14 minutes, while "Loving Walter" is 2 hours 5 minutes long).

McKellen reprised the role in BBC Radio 4's Saturday Play "Walter Now", broadcast on 12 January 2009, in which his character is revisited 26 years later as an old man, when the institution in which he used to live is closed and he is moved into a smaller, group home. Among the issues explored are the subjects of reproductive rights for people who have learning difficulties, and the right to self-determination in areas such as choosing one's own home and housemates.

References

External links
 Page about Walter on Sir Ian McKellen's site
 Link to Channel 4's Walter movie overview
 Link to Channel 4's Walter and June movie overview
 Link to Radio 4's play overview
 
 

1982 television films
1982 films
1982 drama films
BBC Radio 4 programmes
British television films
Channel 4 television dramas
Channel 4 television films
Films about intellectual disability
Films directed by Stephen Frears
Films scored by George Fenton
1980s English-language films